Village Green is a hamlet (and census-designated place) in Onondaga County, New York, United States. The population was 3,891 at the 2010 census.

Village Green is in the eastern part of the town of Van Buren.

Geography
Village Green is located at  (43.131717, -76.308592).

The village is south of the Seneca River and southeast of Baldwinsville.

Most of the community is between Interstate 690 and New York State Route 48.

Demographics

As of the census of 2000, there were 3,945 people, 1,896 households, and 1,033 families residing in the community. The population density was 3,227.6 per square mile (1,248.5/km2). There were 2,053 housing units at an average density of 1,679.7/sq mi (649.7/km2). The racial makeup of the CDP was 96.76% White, 1.04% African American, 0.23% Native American, 0.74% Asian, 0.33% from other races, and 0.91% from two or more races. Hispanic or Latino of any race were 1.14% of the population.

There were 1,896 households, out of which 24.2% had children under the age of 18 living with them, 41.7% were married couples living together, 9.8% had a female householder with no husband present, and 45.5% were non-families. 38.4% of all households were made up of individuals, and 10.0% had someone living alone who was 65 years of age or older. The average household size was 2.08 and the average family size was 2.78.

In the CDP, the population was spread out, with 20.9% under the age of 18, 6.3% from 18 to 24, 35.2% from 25 to 44, 25.1% from 45 to 64, and 12.4% who were 65 years of age or older. The median age was 38 years. For every 100 females, there were 88.8 males. For every 100 females age 18 and over, there were 86.7 males.

The median income for a household in the CDP was $43,243, and the median income for a family was $50,278. Males had a median income of $36,686 versus $29,519 for females. The per capita income for the CDP was $23,559. About 5.9% of families and 6.2% of the population were below the poverty line, including 9.8% of those under age 18 and 6.1% of those age 65 or over.

References

Hamlets in New York (state)
Census-designated places in New York (state)
Syracuse metropolitan area
Census-designated places in Onondaga County, New York
Hamlets in Onondaga County, New York